Me and the Boys is an American sitcom that aired on the ABC network from September 20, 1994 until February 28, 1995. The series features comedian Steve Harvey, who also served as a writer, in his first starring role. The series was created by Bob Myer, Rob Dames and Lenny Ripps, and produced by a.k.a. Productions and Bob Myer Productions in association with ABC Productions.

Synopsis
Set in Dallas, Me and the Boys stars Steve Harvey as Steve Tower, a widower with three sons who ran a video store called The Video Depot. Madge Sinclair (in her last acting role before her death in December 1995) co-starred as Steve's mother-in-law, Mary Cook; and Chaz Lamar Shepherd, Wayne Collins, Jr., and Benjamin LeVert played Steve's sons Artis, William, and Andrew, respectively.

The series was scheduled on Tuesdays following Full House (which co-creators Dames and Ripps had previously written and produced on) and preceding Home Improvement. Despite ranking #20 in the ratings, ABC canceled the series after one season.

Cast

Main
 Steve Harvey as Steve Tower
 Madge Sinclair as Mary Cook, Steve's mother-in-law
 Chaz Lamar Shepherd as Artis Tower, Steve's eldest son
 Wayne Collins, Jr. as William Tower, Steve's middle son
 Benjamin LeVert as Andrew Tower, Steve's youngest son

Recurring
 Karen Malina White as Janet Tower, Steve's sister, an insurance agent

Episodes

Awards and nominations

References

External links

1994 American television series debuts
1995 American television series endings
1990s American black sitcoms
1990s American sitcoms
American Broadcasting Company original programming
Television shows set in Dallas
English-language television shows
Television series by Disney–ABC Domestic Television